Fatemeh Rouhani (born 9 April 1993 in Shahrud) is an Iranian taekwondo practitioner.

References

Asian Games medalists in taekwondo
Taekwondo practitioners at the 2014 Asian Games
Asian Games silver medalists for Iran
1993 births
Living people
Iranian female taekwondo practitioners
Medalists at the 2014 Asian Games
Asian Taekwondo Championships medalists
Islamic Solidarity Games medalists in taekwondo
Islamic Solidarity Games competitors for Iran
21st-century Iranian women